Gibberish, also called jibber-jabber or gobbledygook, is speech that is (or appears to be) nonsense: ranging across speech sounds that are not actual words, pseudowords, language games and specialized jargon that seems nonsensical to outsiders.

"Gibberish" is also used as an imprecation to denigrate or tar ideas or opinions the user disagrees with or finds irksome, a rough equivalent of "nonsense", "folderol", or "claptrap". The implication is that the criticized expression or proposition lacks substance or congruence, as opposed to simply being a differing view.

The related word jibber-jabber refers to rapid talk that is difficult to understand.

Etymology
The etymology of gibberish  is uncertain. The term was first seen in English in the early 16th century. It is generally thought to be an onomatopoeia imitative of speech, similar to the words jabber (to talk rapidly) and gibber (to speak inarticulately).

It may originate from the word jib, which is the Angloromani variant of the Romani language word meaning "language" or "tongue". To non-speakers, the Anglo-Romany dialect could sound like English mixed with nonsense words, and if those seemingly nonsensical words are referred to as jib then the term gibberish could be derived as a descriptor for nonsensical speech.

Samuel Johnson, in A Dictionary of the English Language, published in 1755, wrote that the word gibberish "is probably derived from the chymical cant, and originally implied the jargon of Geber and his tribe." The theory was that gibberish came from the name of a famous 8th century Muslim alchemist, Jābir ibn Hayyān, whose name was Latinized as Geber. Thus, gibberish was a reference to the incomprehensible technical jargon and allegorical coded language used by Jabir and other alchemists. After 1818, editors of Johnson's Dictionary rejected that origin theory.

A discredited alternative theory asserts that it is derived from the Irish word gob or gab ("mouth") or from the Irish phrase Geab ar ais ("back talk, backward chat"). The latter Irish etymology was suggested by Daniel Cassidy, whose work has been criticised by linguists and scholars. The terms geab and geabaire are certainly Irish words, but the phrase geab ar ais does not exist, and the word gibberish exists as a loan-word in Irish as gibiris.

The term gobbledygook was coined by Maury Maverick, a former congressman from Texas and former mayor of San Antonio. When Maverick was chairman of the Smaller War Plants Corporation during World War II, he sent a memorandum that said: "Be short and use plain English. ... Stay off gobbledygook language." Maverick defined gobbledygook as "talk or writing which is long, pompous, vague, involved, usually with Latinized words." The allusion was to a turkey, "always gobbledygobbling and strutting with ridiculous pomposity."

Use

Gobbledygook
The term "gobbledygook" has a long history of use in politics to deride deliberately obscure statements and complicated but ineffective explanations. The following are a few examples:

 Nixon's Oval Office tape from June 14, 1971, showed H. R. Haldeman describing a situation to Nixon as "... a bunch of gobbledygook. But out of the gobbledygook comes a very clear thing: You can't trust the government; you can't believe what they say."

 President Ronald Reagan explained tax law revisions in an address to the nation with the word, May 28, 1985, saying that "most didn’t improve the system; they made it more like Washington itself: Complicated, unfair, cluttered with gobbledygook and loopholes, designed for those with the power and influence to hire high-priced legal and tax advisers."

 United States Supreme Court justice John Roberts dismissed quantitative sociological reasoning as "gobbledygook" in 2017, when arguing against using any mathematical test for gerrymandering.

 Michael Shanks, former chairman to the National Consumer Council of Great Britain, characterized professional gobbledygook as sloppy jargon intended to confuse nonspecialists: "'Gobbledygook' may indicate a failure to think clearly, a contempt for one's clients, or more probably a mixture of both. A system that can't or won't communicate is not a safe basis for a democracy."

In acting
Using gibberish whilst acting can be used as an improvisation exercise in theatre arts education. Another usage of gibberish is as part of Rajneesh's "Gibberish meditation".

In song
The Italian musical artist Adriano Celentano wrote and performed the song "Prisencolinensinainciusol" in gibberish as an intentional mimic of the sound of American English to those who are not fluent in the language.

Other terms and usage 

The terms officialese or bureaucratese refer to language used by officials or authorities. Legalese is a closely related concept, referring to language used by lawyers, legislators, and others involved with the law. The language used in these fields may contain complex sentences and specialized jargon or buzzwords, making it difficult for those outside the field to understand. Speakers or writers of officialese or legalese may recognize that it is confusing or even meaningless to outsiders, but view its use as appropriate within their organization or group.

Bafflegab is a synonym, a slang term referring to confusing or a generally unintelligible use of jargon.

See also

 Babbling
 Code-switching
 Double-talk
 Glossolalia
 Grammelot
 Jargon
 Minionese
 Mumbo jumbo (phrase)
 Nonsense
 Nonsense word
 Pig Latin
 Prisencolinensinainciusol
 Scat singing
 Simlish
 SMOG
 Spin (propaganda)
 Stanley Unwin (comedian)
 Technobabble
 Walla
 Word salad

References

External links

 A statistical gibberish generator based on Markov chains
 The Online Dictionary of Language Terminology
 Gibberish - World Wide Words

 
16th-century neologisms
Terminology
English language
Jargon
Nonsense